David Casa (born 16 November 1968 in Valletta) is a Maltese politician and Member of the European Parliament. He is Malta's longest serving MEP, having served since June 2004. As a member of the Nationalist Party in Malta, he belongs to the European People's Party. 

Casa has been described by Politico as a key MEP for his work as co-rapporteur on the Social Climate Fund. As Quaestor, he was a member of the Bureau of the European Parliament.

He is Co-Chair of the Media Working Group of the European Parliament and the EPP's Head of National Delegation for Malta.

Recent Work

Social Climate Fund 
Casa is a co-rapporteur on the Social Climate Fund, a multibillion euro proposal to ensure social justice in the EU's Fit-for-55 climate package under the European Green Deal. The report, led jointly with Dutch MEP Esther de Lange received decisive backing by the European Parliament in committee and plenary stages. The final vote is due to be taken pending agreement on related controversial climate legislation.

Key legislation 
In 2019, Casa successfully negotiated the Work-Life Balance Directive, which enshrined paternal leave as an EU right for the first time. 

In 2021, he concluded negotiations on the European Social Fund Plus, paving the way for €88 billion to be deployed in the 2021-2027 period.

Quaestor 
He was elected Quaestor of the European Parliament, having withheld his nomination for a second term to support the candidature of Roberta Metsola for President of the European Parliament.

As Quaestor, he was responsible for establishing the Daphne Caruana Galizia Prize for Journalism.

Coordinator, Employment and Social Affairs Committee 
Casa is known for his work in the European Parliament Committee on Employment and Social Affairs and was the European Parliament's lead negotiator on landmark legislation on social affairs. He was the EPP Group Coordinator for the EMPL Committee for two terms during the 8th legislature, having been reelected unanimously in 2017.

European Parliament 
Mr. Casa was the EPP coordinator for the employment and social affairs committee (EMPL) and also serves as the substitute for the economic and monetary affairs committee (ECON).

In the past years, David was a member of the TAXE committee and a full member of the PANA committee, which was entrusted with an inquiry into money laundering, tax avoidance and tax evasion in the European Union.

David Casa became the first ever Maltese member of the European Parliament to lead and successfully negotiate a directive on behalf of the European People's Party (EPP).

The directive introduced 10 days of paid paternity leave, and out the 4 months of parental leave for each parent, 2 months will now be paid and non-transferable between parents. This law also provides for 5 days of annual carers' leave and the right to request flexible working arrangements.

On 26 February 2019 the Committee on Employment and Social Affairs approved the agreement David Casa reached with the Council on the Work Life Balance Directive. This brings the proposed directive one step closer to becoming EU law. The agreement was approved with 31 votes in favour and 3 votes against.

In 2020, David Casa was nominated Co-Chair of the Media Working Group of the European Parliament. The other Co-Chair is Renew MEP Ramona Strugariu.

In 2021, David Casa presided over the first edition of the Daphne Caruana Galizia Prize for Journalism, for which he was responsible as Quaestor of the European Parliament and as Co-Chair of the Media Working Group. The first edition was won by Forbidden Stories for the Pegasus Project.

Early career
 1987: Member of the Executive Committee of the Union of Bankers
 1990: Personal Assistant to the Minister of Foreign Affairs
 1995: Adviser to the Deputy Prime Minister
 1998: Member of the Council of the Confederation of Malta Trade Unions (CMTU)
 1998: Personal Assistant to the Minister of Foreign Affairs
 2001: Founder and Secretary-General of the 'Yes to Europe Movement'
 2004: Elected as a Member of the European Parliament (2004 - 2009)
 2009: Elected as a Member of the European Parliament (2009 - 2014)
 2014: Elected as a Member of the European Parliament (2014 - 2019)
 2019: Elected as a Member of the European Parliament (2019 - 2024)

Moviment Iva 
David Casa was the one of the founding members and subsequently Secretary General of the Moviment Iva ("Yes to Europe Movement"), an organisation which played a fundamental role in the campaign in favour of Malta's accession to the European Union in the run-up to the referendum on the subject.

Mr. Casa was Secretary of the Malta-EU Steering and Action Committee (MEUSAC) and subsequently served as advisor and Personal Assistant to Prof Guido de Marco during his tenure as Minister of Foreign Affairs and Deputy Prime Minister. This role also ensured that David followed the process of membership closely since its inception. In 1999, when Professor Guido de Marco became President, David Casa was the Inter-Ministerial Coordinator for E .U. Matters in the Ministry of Foreign Affairs.

David was active in the Council of the Confederation of Malta Trade Unions and later he formed part of the Executive Committee of the Union of Bankers.

In the field of broadcasting, he led political programmes on Radio 101. Such programmes were aimed at providing information in relation to Malta and the European Union.

Recognition
 Croce dell'Ordine - Sovereign Military Order of Malta (SMOM)

References

External links

 
 
 David Casa website

1968 births
Living people
People from Valletta
Nationalist Party (Malta) MEPs
MEPs for Malta 2004–2009
MEPs for Malta 2009–2014
MEPs for Malta 2014–2019
MEPs for Malta 2019–2024
21st-century Maltese politicians